Liisi Rist (born 25 June 1991) is an Estonian racing cyclist. She competed in the 2013 UCI women's team time trial in Florence. She has won the Estonian National Road Race Championships twice (2013, 2014) and the Estonian National Time Trial Championships seven times (consecutively between 2013 and 2019). In 2013 the Estonian Cycling Federation gave her the Best Female Cyclist award. She also took part at the 2015 European Games in Baku.

Major results
Source: 

2009
 6th Road race, National Road Championships
2010
 National Road Championships
4th Time trial
7th Road race
2011
 National Road Championships
2nd Road race
4th Time trial
2012
 National Road Championships
2nd Road race
2nd Time trial
 3rd Tour de Helsinki
2013
 National Road Championships
1st  Time trial
1st  Road race
2014
 National Road Championships
1st  Time trial
1st  Road race
2015
 National Road Championships
1st  Time trial
2nd Road race
2016
 National Road Championships
1st  Time trial
1st  Criterium
 1st Viljandi Tänavasõit Criterium
 2nd Ledegem
 3rd Dead Sea-Scorpion Pass
 5th Overall 4. NEA
 5th Arava–Arad
 5th Massa–Arad
 8th De Klinge
2017
 National Road Championships
1st  Time trial
9th Road race
2018
 1st  Time trial, National Road Championships
2019
 1st  Time trial, National Road Championships

References

External links

1991 births
Living people
Estonian female cyclists
Cyclists at the 2015 European Games
European Games competitors for Estonia
Sportspeople from Tallinn